Hay Creek is a small trout stream in southeastern Minnesota. It has its headwaters west of Goodhue and empties into the Mississippi River just to the north of Red Wing.  It runs .  Hay Creek was named for the hay meadows near its banks. A railroad once ran along Hay Creek from the claybanks near Goodhue to the pottery and stoneware factories in Red Wing, which also made use of the water from the creek.  The railroad was torn up in 1937, but traces such as trestle pilings remain.

Habitat
Historically, Hay Creek was home to Brook trout and other species, which were depopulated  due to farming practices in the late 18th and 19th centuries.  In the mid-1970s, the Minnesota Department of Natural Resources started focusing on restoring Hay Creek.  By 1976, over half of the length of Hay Creek is a Minnesota designated trout stream.  Like the Vermillion River, Hay Creek receives extensive fishing pressure due to its proximity to Minneapolis–St. Paul.  Minnesota Trout Unlimited has joined the restoration efforts along Hay Creek.

See also
List of rivers of Minnesota

References

External links
  

Rivers of Minnesota
Tributaries of the Mississippi River
Rivers of Goodhue County, Minnesota
Southern Minnesota trout streams
Driftless Area